Nat Patton (February 26, 1881 – July 27, 1957), also known as "Cousin Nat", was a Democratic member of the United States House of Representatives from the 7th District of Texas from 1935 to 1945.

Patton was born on a farm near tiny Tadmor in Houston County near Crockett in east Texas. He attended rural schools and Sam Houston Normal School in Huntsville. He taught in the rural and high schools from 1899 to 1918. He was elected to the Texas House of Representatives in 1912, attended law school at the University of Texas at Austin, was admitted to the bar in 1918, and began his law practice in Crockett.

During the First World War, Patton enlisted in the United States Army but was never sworn in because the armistice was signed. Patton was elected in 1918 as county judge of Houston County and served until 1922. He served in the Texas State Senate from 1929 to 1934. He was also a delegate to the Texas Democratic state conventions in 1924 and 1935. In 1934, Patton was elected to the Seventy-fourth and then to the four succeeding Congresses (January 3, 1935 – January 3, 1945). Patton was defeated for renomination in 1944 by Tom Pickett, and resumed the practice of law in Crockett until his death; he is interred there in Evergreen Memorial Park.

He was a member of the Miller group in Washington.

References

External links

1881 births
1957 deaths
Democratic Party Texas state senators
Democratic Party members of the Texas House of Representatives
People from Houston County, Texas
Democratic Party members of the United States House of Representatives from Texas
20th-century American politicians